Kevin Maguire is a Gaelic footballer who plays for Caulry and the Westmeath county team.

He played as a defender in the Leinster Senior Football Championship finals of 2015 and 2016, and won two Westmeath Intermediate Football Championships in 2014 and in 2019. His brother John also plays for Caulry.

He was a playing member of the team when Westmeath won the 2019 National Football League Division 3 league title by a goal against Laois at Croke Park.

He took over from Kieran Martin as the Westmeath captain in 2021, the first ever Caulry player to be given the role.

He was captain when Westmeath won the 2022 Tailteann Cup. He had received a straight red card in his first Tailteann Cup game against Laois.

Honours
Westmeath
 Tailteann Cup (1): 2022
 National Football League Division 3 (1): 2019

Individual
 Tailteann Cup Team of the Year (1): 2022

References

External links
Stop clock in GAA: Westmeath's Kevin Maguire says a countdown timer 'would make things fairer'

Year of birth missing (living people)
Living people
Gaelic football backs
Westmeath inter-county Gaelic footballers